The Sea Pirate (also known as The Fighting Corsair) is a 1966 French-Italian-Spanish adventure film  directed by  Sergio Bergonzelli and Roy Rowland.

Plot

Cast 

 Gérard Barray as Robert Surcouf 
 Antonella Lualdi as  Margaret Carruthers 
 Terence Morgan as  Lord Blackwood 
  Geneviève Casile as  Marie-Catherine  
 Armand Mestral as  el capità Hans 
 George Rigaud as  French Admiral 
 Gérard Tichy as  Kernan
 Alberto Cevenini as  Garneray
 Giani Esposito as  Napoleon
 Fernando Sancho as  Jailer
 Antonio Molino Rojo as  Andre Chambles
 Ivano Staccioli as  Decrees
 Aldo Sambrell as Sailor

See also
 Surcouf (1925)

References

External links

1966 adventure films
1966 films
Italian adventure films
French adventure films
Spanish adventure films
Films directed by Roy Rowland
Films directed by Sergio Bergonzelli
Italian swashbuckler films
Pirate films
Napoleonic Wars naval films
1960s Italian-language films
1960s Italian films
1960s French films